The 5th edition of the Queen Elisabeth Music Competition took place in 1953. It was the inaugural edition of its composition competition.

Palmares

Jury
  Jean Absil
  Nadia Boulanger
  Marcel Cuvelier (chairman)
  Sem Dresden
  Camargo Guarnieri
  Léon Jongen
  Gian Francesco Malipiero
  Frank Martin
  Aloys Mooser
  Andrzej Panufnik
  Marcel Poot
  Domingo Santa Cruz

References
  Queen Elisabeth Music Competition

05
1953 in Belgium